Amanda Blake Waller (née White), also known as "the Wall", is a character appearing in American comic books published by DC Comics. The character first appeared in Legends #1 in 1986 and was created by John Ostrander, Len Wein, and John Byrne. Amanda Waller is an antagonist and occasional ally to the superheroes of the DC Universe, occasionally described as a supervillain.

She is the director of the Suicide Squad and a specialist who oversees research into metahumans. Though lacking superpowers herself, the character is a ruthless, high-ranking government official who uses guile, political connections, and sheer intimidation to achieve her goals, often in the name of national security. Waller is commonly associated with the fictional government agencies Checkmate and A.R.G.U.S.

In recent years, the character has been substantially adapted into animated and live-action media. Several actresses have voiced or portrayed the character: CCH Pounder for various animated projects; Pam Grier on the live-action series Smallville; Angela Bassett in the live-action film Green Lantern; Sheryl Lee Ralph in the animated series Young Justice; Cynthia Addai-Robinson in the live-action series Arrow; Yvette Nicole Brown in the franchise DC Super Hero Girls; and Viola Davis in the DC Extended Universe films Suicide Squad, The Suicide Squad, and Black Adam, as well as the HBO Max series Peacemaker.

Publication history
The people most responsible for shaping the character in her earliest appearances were John Ostrander and Kim Yale, in the pages of the Suicide Squad series in the late 1980s.

Nicknamed "the Wall", she is a former congressional aide and government agent often placed in charge of the Suicide Squad, a semi-secret government-run group of former supervillains working in return for amnesty. She later served as Secretary of Metahuman Affairs under President Lex Luthor, before being arrested in the wake of Luthor's public fall from grace. Waller was reassigned to the leadership of Checkmate as White Queen, but was forced to resign because of her involvement in Operation Salvation Run.

Fictional character biography

Early history

Amanda Waller has been established as a widow who escaped Chicago's Cabrini–Green housing projects with her surviving family after one of her sons, one of her daughters and her husband were murdered. Waller excelled in political science and became a congressional aide. During that time, she discovered the existence of the first two incarnations of the Squad. Taking elements from both of these, she proposed the development of its third incarnation to the White House and was placed in charge upon its approval.

Federal service years
The Agency was formed by Amanda Waller to serve as a small, quasi-independent branch of Task Force X. Valentina Vostok brought former NYPD Lieutenant Harry Stein into the Agency as an operative. Amanda Waller later promoted Stein to the command position and demoted Vostok. Harry Stein would later reorganize the Agency and name it Checkmate.

Waller's tenure as the official in charge of the third Suicide Squad was tumultuous and controversial. Despite many successes, she developed a habit of defying her superiors in Washington to achieve goals both legitimate and personal on more than one occasion. The earliest conflict between her and her superiors revolved around the leadership of the Suicide Squad. Although she proposed the Bronze Tiger, the man she had helped out of his brainwashing, lead the team he was instead relegated to second-in-command, and Rick Flag Jr. was made the leader. Waller resentfully presumed the situation to be racially charged, related to not only her own status as a black woman, but also Bronze Tiger's own skin tone, although the Tiger himself did not believe this was a factor, instead believing this was a result of mistrust due to the brainwashing imposed upon him by the League of Assassins.

Her relationship with the Squad itself was one of mutual dislike. Most of the team's criminal members did not really take to Waller's methods (most notably Captain Boomerang), and even the team's heroes were often at odds with Waller. Waller's inability to deal and compromise with her troops led to Nemesis's departure from the team and the death of a US senator, which indirectly caused the death of Rick Flag Jr. Those type of conflicts, however, were not only limited to her superiors and her team, but also extended to Batman, who opposed the forming of the Suicide Squad (although he would later help to reform it). Nonetheless, the team remained loyal to her, often choosing to side with her instead of the government.

It was ultimately revealed the reason Amanda Waller kept the heroes such as Nightshade around, was in order for them to act as her conscience. Over the course of her first run with the Suicide Squad, her actions became increasingly erratic as she fought to retain control of the Squad. This was heightened by the public revelation of the Suicide Squad, and her being officially replaced, although her 'replacement' was in fact an actor, and Waller remained the team's director.

Even that secret would eventually be revealed and Amanda Waller would be put on trial. During this time, the Squad also became involved in an interagency conflict in a crossover between the Checkmate and Suicide Squad titles called the Janus Directive.

One of the field missions is against her will, as many members of the Squad, Waller included, are forcibly kidnapped and taken to Apokolips. This is because team member Duchess remembered her past as Lashina of the Female Furies, instead of being amnesiac as she pretended, and wished to return home with suitable sacrifices. The Squad suffers fatalities battling Apokolips' forces, with Waller personally confronting Granny Goodness. However, the confrontation ended with the deaths of Dr. Light and one of Waller's own nieces, and Count Vertigo near-fatally wounded.

She eventually found herself serving prison time for her pursuit of an organized crime cartel based in New Orleans called the LOA and killing its leadership, using Squad operatives Ravan, Poison Ivy and Deadshot in the process.

The Suicide Squad's rebirth
Waller is eventually pardoned and released a year later to reorganize the Suicide Squad as a freelance mercenary group at the behest of Sarge Steel to deal with a crisis in Vlatava, Count Vertigo's home country; Waller allowed herself to enter prison because she knew two things perfectly well: one, by confronting the LOA with Squad operatives, she had crossed the line, and two, she would return to her position quite easily if she was ever needed again. Afterwards, the Suicide Squad performs a variety of missions, often treading dangerous political terrain when dealing with Soviet and Israeli interests. Most notably, the Squad help destroy the plans of a shadow organization to throw Qurac, Israel and the US into political disarray.

During the course of her renewed tenure with this team, Amanda became closer to her operatives, even accompanying them on their field missions. This allows for her and her team to bond more effectively, although she retains her dominant and threatening personality.

Waller quits after a later field mission, in which she personally takes down the seemingly immortal dictator of a small, South American island nation. As it turned out, he wasn't immortal, but had an immense amount of psychic power, and by tricking him, Waller merely provided a form of assisted suicide.

Soon after, Amanda Waller organizes the Shadow Fighters to confront the villain Eclipso. Again, she would confront Sarge Steel. Her first attempt at a team, formed with the assistance of Bruce Gordon and his wife Mona, did not go well. Most of the team are brutally murdered infiltrating Eclipso's stronghold. Her second attempt with a much larger team has much more success.

During the Bloodlines debacle, the President sends Guy Gardner to fetch Waller from her island 'retirement'. She leads a multi-hero affair that results in the destruction of the alien parasites. She rejoins federal service, initially as Southeastern regional director for the Department of Extranormal Operations. She is promoted to Secretary of Metahuman Affairs as a member of the Lex Luthor Presidential Administration.

International service
Lex Luthor's brief tenure in office leads to Amanda Waller being jailed. This does not last long. She is released by Luthor's successor Jonathan Vincent Horne, who orders her to take command of the secret agent organization Checkmate. The organization had been shaken up due to The OMAC Project debacle and the related murderous leadership of Maxwell Lord whom Waller has had previous history with. Waller takes the rank of Black King until the United States and United Nations decide what to do with that organization. In the latter issues of 52, Waller is shown commissioning the imprisoned Atom Smasher to organize a new Suicide Squad to attack Black Adam and his allies. This ends with the death of Squad member Persuader and the expected public relations turn against the Black Marvel family.

In the revamped Checkmate series set in the One Year Later continuity, Waller is shown to have been assigned by the UN to serve as Checkmate's White Queen, a member of its senior policy-making executive. Due to her previous activities, her appointment is contingent on her having no direct control over operations. Regardless, she continues to pursue her own agenda, secretly using the Suicide Squad to perform missions in favor of American interests and blackmailing Fire. It is also implied that she may have betrayed a mission team in an attempt to protect her secrets and facilitated an attack on Checkmate headquarters for her own gain.

She then is in charge of Operation Salvation Run, an initiative involving the mass deportation of supervillains to an alien world. When this was discovered by the rest of Checkmate, she was forced into resigning as White Queen in exchange for their delay in revealing what the US government was doing. She continues to run the Suicide Squad, and has been implanted with nanotechnology to allow her to directly control Chemo during missions.

During the Superman/Batman storyline "K", it is revealed that Waller has hoarded Kryptonite and used it to power an anti-Superman group called the Last Line, and a Doomsday-like creature codenamed "All-American Boy", who has Kryptonite shards growing out of his body. All-American Boy, (real name: Josh Walker) was deceived into an experiment to use Kryptonite to bond cell scrapings taken from Doomsday to a human host, battles Superman, devastating Smallville in the process. Batman, with the help of Brannon, the Last Line's leader, locate Josh's parents who convince him to stop. Waller is forced to pay towards repairing Smallville in return for her dealings in the AAB project to remain secret. 'Last Line' itself rebels against Waller because of her deceptions.

In the eight-issue series of Suicide Squad: Raise the Flag, she is again seen leading the Suicide Squad at some point when the General returned to Earth after his exile, and was promptly drafted into the Squad with special explosive implants grafted into his arm and brain to make him compliant with Waller's demands. Here, she personally uses technology devised by Cliff Carmichael to gain a measure of control over Chemo, allowing her to use the toxic behemoth for the Squad's benefit. Rick Flag is revealed to have survived the events at Jotunheim and was returned to Waller, who revealed to him Rick Flag Jr. was never anything but an alias, and that he was in reality a brainwashed soldier remade into Flag to serve Eiling's ends.

She leads, as Chemo, an attack on a Dubai supercorp intending to release a deadly virus. However, Carmichael, with Eiling and part of her team, betrays her as part of Eiling's plan to benefit from the release of the virus, and she is nearly killed when Eiling orders a compliant Flag to use her pen, actually a transmitter, to detonate her own explosive implant. Instead, Flag, tricking him, detonates Eiling's own, releasing her and ultimately rejoining the Squad, refusing the chance of a normal life.

She later attempted to forcibly return several members of the Secret Six (Bane and Deadshot) into the Suicide Squad, and when her plan backfired due to the events of Blackest Night and the defiance of the Six, she was shot by Deadshot and privately revealed to King Faraday to be their new secret leader, Mockingbird. When Faraday questioned the need to be informed of the situation, and even the need to bring the Six under the banner of the Squad when she already controlled them, Amanda merely shrugged it off, stating "her left and right hand only knew what the other was thinking" in a strict need-to-know basis, implying Faraday will one day need that knowledge.

The New 52
In The New 52 (a 2011 reboot of the DC Comics universe), Amanda Waller is shown to be in direct command of the Suicide Squad, choosing its members and having final say over when and if their implanted explosives are detonated. It is revealed she requested a command of a unit she could send to their deaths without regret after an operation she was involved in resulted in the death of all other squad members, including several she had personally recruited. She was also involved with Team 7 in some capacity while serving in the United States Army as a Captain, which led to her temporarily leaving the spy business. Also, this version of Amanda Waller is re-imagined as a young, thin woman in contrast with her original design.

Amanda Waller later formed the Justice League of America that is separate from the main Justice League where she is shown as the Director of A.R.G.U.S. She recruited James Gordon Jr. who was alive despite his apparent death at the hands of his sister Barbara while saving their mother. However, it is shown that James Jr. only agreed to join as he is in love with Waller.

During the "Forever Evil" storyline, Amanda Waller is shown at Belle Reve trying to get Black Manta to join the Suicide Squad at the time when Deathstorm and Power Ring infiltrate the prison. Amanda Waller later contacts Deadshot to get the Suicide Squad back together. Later clues point to an imposter Amanda Waller causing trouble behind the scenes.

DC Rebirth
Amanda Waller returns to her original design with the DC Rebirth initiative. When confronted by Barack Obama about Task Force X, she convinces him the Suicide Squad needs to exist to deal with threats neither the President or the Justice League can be aware of, while conceding to nominate a non-criminal field leader to carry out her directives during missions and keep the convicts in line. She visits Rick Flag in Guantanamo Bay, where he had been imprisoned for disobeying direct instructions to save his teammates, and tries to convince him to work alongside supervillains for a greater good; she succeeds, releases him and makes him the field leader of Task Force X.

In issue #11 of Suicide Squad (2016), as a part of DC Rebirth, Amanda Waller is shot and killed. Her death is confirmed in issue #12. However, it is revealed in issue #15 she faked her death with the help of Deadshot, who fired a bullet at her heart, and Enchantress, who magically moved the bullet to the most reparable part of the human heart. Because of this, she is able to use Deadshot against the villain Rustam and the international shadow organization known only as the People.

Other versions

Flashpoint
In the alternate timeline of the "Flashpoint" event, Amanda Waller is an advisor to the President of the United States who tells him Hal Jordan is insubordinate and irresponsible. However, the President tells her the world needs Hal as a hero.

Batman Beyond
Amanda Waller appears in the Batman Beyond comic series, set before the events of "Epilogue", where she was involved in the creation of Dick Grayson's clone to create a new Batman, reasoning that Grayson was more stable than his mentor, only for the clone to become the new Hush and start killing off Batman's old rogues' gallery, including retired villains such as Signalman and Calendar Man. Even after the clone's attempt to destroy Gotham is only narrowly averted by Terry McGinnis, the real Dick Grayson, and the new Catwoman, Waller is shown to still be working on further clones of the original Batman and his allies.

Arrow
In Arrow tie-in comic, Arrow: Season 2.5, Waller sends Suicide Squad to deal with situation in Kahndaq where a terrorist members and its leader Khem-Adam begin executing a lot of people due to Khem-Adam's desire to save a country from foreign influence. Her squad is successful in killing members of the group, except for Adam who is taken away by Nyssa al Ghul and Sara Lance in Nanda Parbat where he is executed by a member of the League of Assassins.

The Flash
In The Flash tie-in comic, Season Zero, Waller sends Suicide Squad (consisting of Cupid, Captain Boomerang and Floyd Lawton) to survey King Shark destroying an aquarium, then sends them to extract him. Waller takes Lamden to A.R.G.U.S. detention center to be chained up. She takes a woman to see him, before cutting him open to carefully dissect him. After dissection, Waller sends him across the other side of the country to begin as part of the Suicide Squad. Soon, Barry Allen comes to rescue him, but Waller sent some drones after him, created by General Wade Eiling. They eventually find where King Shark had been, but Barry is quickly captured and is told of what happened to Lamden.

DC Comics Bombshells
In DC Comics Bombshells, Commander Amanda Waller is the head of the "Bombshells" project during World War II. In DC Comics Bombshells Annual 1, she is shown to also be Superintendent of the United States Military Academy.

Injustice 2
In the prequel to Injustice 2, Waller breaks into the Quiver (Green Arrow's hideout) to arrest Harley Quinn, believing Harley should still be punished for her crimes despite Harley's role in taking down Superman. After Deadshot aids her in capturing Harley, she forces Harley into the Suicide Squad. However immediately afterwards, she is killed by Jason Todd, who was going around as an impostor Batman.

DC Comics Secret Hero Society
In the world of DC Comics Secret Hero Society, Amanda Waller is the guidance counselor, truancy officer, and head of detention at Justice Preparatory Academy.

In other media

Television

 Amanda Waller appears in Justice League Unlimited, voiced by CCH Pounder. This version leads the secret Project Cadmus at the government's behest to create a counter-force to the Justice League should they go rogue like their alternate reality counterparts. Under her watch, Cadmus created the Ultimen, Galatea, and Doomsday. Additionally, she is responsible for the second Batman's existence as part of Project Batman Beyond.
 Amanda Waller appears in Smallville, portrayed by Pam Grier. Introduced in the ninth season two-hour episode "Absolute Justice", this version is a ranking agent of both Checkmate and the Suicide Squad. It's noted by several characters that Waller would end up causing conflict in her paranoia to be ready for a fight. In the episode "Checkmate", Waller captures Martian Manhunter in the agency's headquarters after failing to kidnap and recruit Green Arrow for the government. In the episode "Sacrifice", Waller is working with Stuart Campbell (aka the White Knight) to track down Tess Mercer to lead Checkmate to the Kandorians, leading to a confrontation with Major Zod and presumably killed. Waller is presumed dead in the tenth season, as Flag is seen acting on his own to "protest" the Vigilante Registration Act. It is hinted that she may have known about the threat of Darkseid. 
 Amanda Waller appears in Young Justice, voiced by Sheryl Lee Ralph. This version was the warden of Belle Reve. In the episode "Terrors", after she failed to stop a breakout, she was replaced by Hugo Strange. She returns in the episode "Leverage", where she has formed the Suicide Squad from Rick Flag, Black Manta, Captain Boomerang, and Monsieur Mallah. Waller sent them on a mission to Russia to eliminate the Rocket Red Brigade before they can be formed. However, they're foiled in their mission by the Team. When the Suicide Squad is returned to Belle Reve, Waller reveals them as her special ops team and voices her knowledge of the Team's formation. She threatens Aquaman II with exposing the Team if he exposes the Suicide Squad.
 Amanda Waller appears in Arrow, portrayed by Cynthia Addai-Robinson. This version is the Director of A.R.G.U.S., making her first appearance in the second season episode "Keep Your Enemies Closer". She had John Diggle abducted as she needs him and the Arrow's help in retrieving Lyla Michaels from Russia (who was searching for Floyd Lawton to retrieve him as well), and is aware that Oliver Queen is Arrow. She later appears briefly in the episode "Tremors" talking to Bronze Tiger after the latter returns to prison. She offers him a position on her unit, heavily hinted to be the Suicide Squad, to reduce his sentence and because she needs someone of his talents for her squad. In the episode "Suicide Squad", Waller assembles the team (consisting of Deadshot, Bronze Tiger, Michaels, Shrapnel and Diggle) to destroy a biological weapon in Markovia. It is implied that Waller first met Oliver (as they're on a first-name basis) during the latter's time as a castaway along with Slade Wilson. She is seen again in the episode "City of Blood" where Diggle and Felicity ask for her to help them find Oliver having gone missing after his mother's death, and traces Oliver down for them. In the following episode "Streets of Fire", Waller is shown to be preparing to bomb Starling City to contain Slade's Mirukuru army. After Oliver reveals to her that he has the cure for the Mirukuru, she gives Oliver until dawn to stop Slade and his army. In the episode "Unthinkable", Waller calls off the drone from bombing the city after Slade's defeat. In the final scene in a flashback, she rescues and recruits Oliver in Hong Kong. Throughout the beginning of the third season, flashbacks explore how Waller attempts to get Oliver to cooperate and train to become a valuable asset of A.R.G.U.S. and has to use blackmail and other tactics to ensure his loyalty and commitment to training. She sends Oliver and Maseo Yamashiro to get the Alpha-Omega virus from China White and her Triad to prevent bids for buyers. After they succeed, a military general Matthew Shrieve goes rogue and begins to kill anyone in Hong Kong with a bioweapon, including killing Amanda as well, but is saved from Oliver and Maseo. In the present-day episode, "Suicidal Tendencies", Waller sends the Suicide Squad (including John and Lyla) to Kaznia to extract US senator Joseph Cray from terrorists who are holding him hostage, but this was revealed as a ruse by Cray. When Lyla persuaded Waller to admit the truth of this mission to the world, she refused it, which leaves Lyla and John bitter about her leadership and her mannerisms. She is shot in the head and killed in the fourth season episode "A.W.O.L." when A.R.G.U.S. is infiltrated by the criminal paramilitary organization Shadowspire after Waller confirms that she cannot be forced to give Shadowspire access to any information from A.R.G.U.S. records, including its Rubicon protocol. Waller also appears briefly in flashbacks when she sends Oliver on Lian Yu to investigate a drug harvesting operation by Shadowspire (under the leadership of Baron Reiter), but is revealed to be a finding a mystical object who would later appear in the present day. Michaels later becomes Waller's successor, and works to reform A.R.G.U.S. through such acts as disbanding Task Force X, although Michaels keeps criminals such as King Shark locked up for security purposes.
 Amanda Waller appears in season three of HBO Max's adult animated series Harley Quinn, voiced by Tisha Campbell. Debuting in "Harlivy", Harley Quinn and Poison Ivy bump into her after springing Clayface and King Shark from Arkham Asylum where she claims that Poison Ivy hasn't done anything evil in years. To prove her wrong, Harley and Ivy abduct her and take her to the valley of prehistoric plants. Suicide Squad member Plastique rescues Waller and blows herself up to give time for Waller to get away.

Film

 Amanda Waller appears in Superman/Batman: Public Enemies, voiced again by CCH Pounder. This version is depicted as more sympathetic, refusing President Lex Luthor's offer of a prominent position in the President's "new world order" to provide Superman and Batman with information they can use to destroy a Kryptonite asteroid heading for Earth.
 Amanda Waller appears in Green Lantern, portrayed by Angela Bassett. This version is a scientist working for the DEO under the command of Senator Robert Hammond. After the xenobiologist Hector Hammond acquires the power to read minds from exposure to Parallax's DNA, he learns that her family was killed by a gunman when she was younger. Hammond attempts to kill her using his telekinetic powers in a later confrontation, but she is rescued by Green Lantern.
 Amanda Waller appears in Batman: Assault on Arkham, with CCH Pounder reprising her role. Set in the universe of the Batman: Arkham video games, she is shown in a rather negative light, sending the Suicide Squad in a smoke screen mission whose only real purpose is killing Riddler, as the villain knows how to defuse the Suicide Squad's implanted bombs. At the end of the movie, she is warned by Batman to avoid activating the Suicide Squad in the future and dismisses his warning, challenging him to try and denounce her. She finds a laser dot from Deadshot's gun on her in the final scene, but, as revealed in Batman: Arkham Underworld, Batman prevented Deadshot from ultimately carrying out the assassination.
 An alternate version of Amanda Waller appears in Justice League: Gods and Monsters, voiced by Penny Johnson Jerald. This version is the President of the United States and is more sympathetic, not willing to take lives, even if necessary.
 Amanda Waller appears in DC Super Hero Girls: Super Hero High, voiced by Yvette Nicole Brown.
 Amanda Waller appears in DC Super Hero Girls: Hero of the Year, voiced again by Yvette Nicole Brown.
 Amanda Waller appears in DC Super Hero Girls: Intergalactic Games, voiced again by Yvette Nicole Brown.
 Amanda Waller appears in Lego DC Super Hero Girls: Brain Drain, voiced again by Yvette Nicole Brown.
 Amanda Waller appears in Suicide Squad: Hell to Pay, voiced by Vanessa Williams. Again, she monitors the Task Force X Squad while threatening to kill them with the bombs implanted on their necks if they rebel. After discovering that she has a terminal disease, Waller sends her Squad to find Steel Maxum and acquire a mystical card he (formerly) possessed.
 Amanda Waller appears in Lego DC Super Hero Girls: Super-Villain High, voiced again by Yvette Nicole Brown.
 Amanda Waller appears in DC Super Hero Girls: Legends of Atlantis, voiced again by Yvette Nicole Brown.
 Amanda Waller appears in Batman: Hush, with Vanessa Williams reprising her role. She shows up to transfer Bane out of Blackgate Penitentiary before the fiend breaks free. With Batman's help, she is able to tranquilize Bane to capture and use him for her Suicide Squad. Since she has not died between films, it means Waller either found a way to prolong her life or her disease is in remission.
 Amanda Waller is mentioned in Justice League Dark: Apokolips War. She died of cancer at some point offscreen, resulting in Harley Quinn taking leadership of the Squad.

DC Extended Universe 

 Amanda Waller appears in Suicide Squad, portrayed by Viola Davis. A senior civil servant and director of A.R.G.U.S., this version of Waller established the Suicide Squad and finds herself an occasional ally-of-convenience of Batman, whose secret identity she is aware of. After the death of Superman, she spoke with several others speaking her concern that the next Superman may not share his world views. To fill the gap of power, Waller wanted to assemble Task Force X, a team of expendable metahumans who would be used to execute covert operations against dangerous threats. One of Waller's greatest assets was June Moone, the host of the witch Enchantress, and was partially controlled by Moone's boyfriend and Waller's key ally Rick Flag.
 Amanda Waller appears in The Suicide Squad, with Davis reprising her role. Waller deploys two Task Force X groups in Corto Maltese following a coup to disrupt the country’s "Project Starfish", revealed to be a mission to conceal America’s role in the project.
 Waller makes uncredited cameo appearances in the Peacemaker season 1 episodes "A Whole New Whirled" and "It's Cow or Never", with Davis reprising her role. In the first episode, Waller has a conversation with her daughter, Leota Adebayo, regarding her secret mission while working on Project Butterfly. In the season finale, she is seen watching a broadcast of Adebayo exposing Task Force X and Project Butterfly to the public, as well as Waller's involvement in both programs. Throughout the first season, Waller is revealed to have used Adebayo in an attempt to wrongfully frame Peacemaker and put him in prison.
 Waller appeared in Black Adam (2022), with Davis reprising her role.When Teth-Adam was freed on Kahndaq and killed several Intergang members, Waller contacted Hawkman, who had reformed the Justice Society, to defeat and imprison Adam, which they succeeded in doing, but Adam would eventually escape. After the Battle of Kahndaq, Waller called Adam to threaten him not to flee his nation, sending Superman to stop him.

Video games
 Amanda Waller appears in DC Universe Online, voiced by Debra Cole. In the Bludhaven Alert, Major Force mentioned to the players that Waller has sent him to Bludhaven to gather samples of Chemo and to test out the Chemoids. If the setting is turned on when queuing for an instance, she may recruit hero players into Task Force X and order them to complete the instance as villains, or recruit villain players into Suicide Squad who must complete it as heroes, and provide intro messages in both cases.
 Amanda Waller is mentioned in some pre-game dialogues between Vixen, Captain Cold, Black Adam, Cyborg and Deadshot in Injustice 2.
 Amanda Waller appears in Batman: The Enemy Within, voiced by Debra Wilson. She is the director of the Agency and arrives in Gotham to track down the Pact, a group of criminals led by a former employee known as Riddler. Seizing control of the GCPD, Waller works with Batman to capture the group. After learning the vigilante's identity from one of her agents following the death of Riddler, she threatens to reveal it if he doesn't cooperate with her. It is eventually revealed that Waller has also been planning to obtain the LOTUS virus from SANCTUS, synthesize a usable version, and blackmail the members of the Pact into working for the Agency using it as an incentive. However, these are quickly put in disarray when one of her agents contaminates Riddler's blood, preventing the Agency from doing so. During the final episode depending on which path Joker takes, Waller either works with Batman to capture the Joker or tries to threaten him into handing over both the new vigilante and the LOTUS virus. Regardless, she leaves Gotham with the Agency in gratitude for his actions and promises not to reveal his identity while also reaching an understanding with James Gordon.

Arkham series
 Amanda Waller appears in Batman: Arkham Origins, voiced again by CCH Pounder. In the post-credits scene, she approaches Deathstroke at a prison cell and offers a spot in her Suicide Squad in exchange for a commuted prison sentence to which Deathstroke is left considering.
 Amanda Waller appears in Batman: Arkham Origins Blackgate, voiced again by CCH Pounder. She is heavily implied to be the true mastermind behind the prison uprising, having orchestrated the events and manipulated both the criminals and the agents to find the best candidates for the Suicide Squad. She purposely hired Catwoman to break Bane out of Blackgate, though the mission was a failure due to Batman's involvement. However, Waller picked out Deadshot and Bronze Tiger as two new candidates for the Suicide Squad.
 Amanda Waller will appear in Suicide Squad: Kill the Justice League with Debra Wilson reprising the role from Batman The Enemy Within, in both voice and facial capture. Wilson made a live appearance as Amanda Waller at the 2021 Game Awards, moments before the world premiere of the game's gameplay trailer.

Lego series
 Amanda Waller appears as a playable character in Lego Batman 3: Beyond Gotham,  voiced by Cynthia Addai-Robinson. She is part of the DLC "The Squad". Waller also narrates "The Squad" level.
 Amanda Waller appears as a NPC in Lego DC Super-Villains, voiced by Yvette Nicole Brown.

Web series
 An alternate version appears in Justice League: Gods and Monsters Chronicles (which is a companion to Justice League: Gods and Monsters), voiced by Penny Johnson Jerald.  She's the President of the United States.
 An alternate version appears in DC Super Hero Girls, voiced by Yvette Nicole Brown. She is the principal of Super Hero High.
 Amanda Waller appears in Lego DC Super Hero Girls, voiced again by Yvette Nicole Brown.

Miscellaneous
 As an alternate reality game to promote the Green Lantern film, Amanda Waller's official blog—written by Waller's creator John Ostrander—was posted online. "Waller" invited readers to participate in the Zooniverse project; participants were rewarded with audio clips of the film's characters.

Further reading
 The Spectacular Sisterhood of Superwomen: Awesome Female Characters from Comic Book History by Hope Nicholson, Quirk Books (2017)

References

External links
Amanda Waller's "official blog" (via archive.org)
DCU Guide: Amanda Waller
Comic Book Awards Almanac

Batman characters
Characters created by John Byrne (comics)
Characters created by John Ostrander
Characters created by Len Wein
Comics characters introduced in 1986
DC Comics female supervillains
DC Comics film characters
Fictional African-American people
Fictional American physicians
Fictional characters from Chicago
Fictional marksmen and snipers
Fictional mass murderers
Fictional spymasters
Fictional United States Army personnel
Fictional United States cabinet members
Suicide Squad members